The Martyrdom of Saint Peter Martyr is a 1526-1528 oil on panel painting by Palma Vecchio, now in the Museo d'arte sacra San Martino in Alzano Lombardo.

History
For a long time it was not attributed to Palma Vecchio. It was his entry for the 1528 competition held by the confraternity of San Pietro to produce an altarpiece at Santi Giovanni e Paolo, Venice, as did Titian (whose entry was destroyed by fire in 1867, though a print of it survives) and Pordenone (whose entry survives in the Uffizi) and also shows the asssassination). 

Titian won the competition but the congregation of flagellants ("disciplini") in Alzano was looking for a work to be their high altarpiece for their new church dedicated to Saint Peter Martyr and showed interest in Palma Vecchio's work. That church was rebuilt in 1510-1529 and the work may have been acquired during those years. The altarpiece in which the work was placed to complete the apse was probably designed by Pietro Isabello, Palma's friend and contemporary, who had also designed the church.

Bernard Berenson identified the work as a Lorenzo Lotto from 1514-1515 - that artist knew Palma well and may have acted as a link between the artist and the flagellants. Roberto Longhi restored the current attribution in 1926.

References

Paintings of Peter of Verona
Paintings by Palma Vecchio
1528 paintings
Paintings in the Province of Bergamo
Paintings of gods